State Hockey Centre may refer to:

State Hockey Centre (South Australia), Adelaide, Australia.
State Netball and Hockey Centre, Victoria, Australia.
Queensland State Hockey Centre, Queensland, Australia.
Sydney Olympic Park Hockey Centre, New South Wales, Australia.